Alick Lindsay Poole  (4 March 1908 – 2 January 2008) was a New Zealand botanist and forester.

Academic career

Poole started at the New Zealand State Forest Service 1926, then to Auckland University College on a scholarship. After various jobs during the Great Depression, he joined the Botany Division of the DSIR in 1937. He enlisted in 1940, and spent the war at the Scientific Liaison Office in London. After the war he worked for the  British zone in Germany gaining valuable experience. In 1947 he was appointed Assistant Director of the Botany Division of DSIR. In 1951 he was appointed Assistant Director of the New Zealand Forest Service and rose to Director-General, retiring in 1971. He was elected Fellow of the Royal Society of New Zealand in 1962. In the 1971 New Year Honours, Poole was appointed a Companion of the Order of the British Empire, for services to the development of forestry and the forest industries.

He died in Wellington in 2008.

Selected works
 Trees and shrubs of New Zealand
 Wild animals in New Zealand
 The use of vegetation
 Southern beeches
 Forestry in New Zealand; the shaping of policy

References

20th-century New Zealand botanists
1908 births
2008 deaths
University of Auckland alumni
New Zealand foresters
Fellows of the Royal Society of New Zealand
People associated with Department of Scientific and Industrial Research (New Zealand)
New Zealand Commanders of the Order of the British Empire